The Andean negrito (Lessonia oreas) is a species of bird in the tyrant-flycatcher family Tyrannidae found in the Andes in South America. It is closely related to, and was long considered to be the same species as, the Austral negrito of southern South America. The species is monotypic, having no subspecies.

Description
It is sexually dimorphic in its plumage; males having black plumage with a rufous back and silvery-white flight feathers (that are only noticeable in flight). The female has a rufous back as well but the undersides and head are sooty and the upperparts are blackish brown. The throat is whitish and the breast tinged with dull rufous. The species has exceptionally long hindclaws, like those of a pipit.

Distribution and habitat
The Andean negrito ranges through the mountainous regions of central Peru south into western Bolivia, down into north eastern Chile and northern Argentina. It lives around lakes, streams and bogs and in seasonally flooded plains, in areas with low ground cover. The species is non-migratory.

Behaviour
The Andean negrito is a terrestrial insect hunter that is found in pairs or small family groups. It often perches on elevated tussocks or rocks to watch for prey. Prey is either sallied after on the wing from on or close to the ground, or chased after on foot.

Little is known about its breeding behaviour. In Chile it breeds between October and January. Males perform a fluttering display flight that goes  in the air. Nests are simple cups hidden inside tussock grass, into which 3–4 eggs are laid.

References

Andean negrito
Birds of the Andes
Birds of the Puna grassland
Andean negrito
Andean negrito
Andean negrito
Taxonomy articles created by Polbot